The Gruža (Serbian Cyrillic: Гружа) is a geographical region in central Serbia. This region, containing a village of the same name, is poetically referred to as the Heart of Šumadija.

Geography
The Gruža is a micro-region and makes the southern part of the Šumadija region of central Serbia (also called High Šumadija). It is bounded by the West Pomoravlje to the south, the mountain of Gledićke planine and the Levač region to the east, the Takovo and Lepenica regions to the north and the Kotlenik mountain to the west. The central part of the region is the depression of Gruža (Gružanska kotlina; Cyrillic: Гружанска котлина) in the river valley. Due to its geographical location, in the center of Serbia, it is nicknamed the Heart of Šumadija.

The region is very fertile and thus almost exclusively an agricultural area. Even though populated by many villages (58 settlements), they all have small population and are increasingly depopulating, despite the land's fertility. Population fell from 23,192 in 1971 (56 inhabitants per km2) to 16,148 in 2002 (only 39 inhabitants per km2), as previously very much developed industries in the nearby towns of Gornji Milanovac, Kraljevo and Kragujevac constantly attracted the manpower from the Gruža region (for example, the density of population in the neighboring Lepenica region, where the city of Kragujevac is located, is over 280 inhabitants per km2).

The Gruža river valley in the center of the region is the route for the regional Kragujevac-Kraljevo road and railway.

The center of the region is the municipal seat of Knić, which is located 4 km west from the Gruža river.

Culture
Lepe li su nano Gružanke devojke (Oh grandma, girls from Gruža are beautiful) is an old and popular Serbian folk song.

Geographical regions of Serbia
Geography of Šumadija and Western Serbia
Šumadija